W.H. Dorrance House is a historic home located at Camden in Oneida County, New York. According to town records, it was built about 1880 and is an irregularly massed, -story wood-frame structure in the Queen Anne style. The architect was Utica, NY-based M.H. Hubbard.  It features an engaged circular tower with conical roof.

It was listed on the National Register of Historic Places in 1999.

Notes

References

Houses on the National Register of Historic Places in New York (state)
Queen Anne architecture in New York (state)
Houses in Oneida County, New York
National Register of Historic Places in Oneida County, New York